Founded in 1978, The ENDS Report  is a magazine published in the United Kingdom and covering environmental policy and business, news, official reports, UK and EU policy and legislation, and how environmental issues affect corporate strategy. It is published monthly by Environmental Data Services Ltd, part of the Haymarket Group, and is subscription only. The headquarters of the magazine is in London.

Regular sections include:
 News
 Corporate
 Energy & Climate
 Waste & Resources
 Pollution and Clean-up
 Supply Chain
 Science
 Features
 Policy Briefing (National)
 Policy Briefing (International)
 In Parliament
 In Court
 Events
 Services, Courses and Appointments
 Environmental Trends

Former editor 
The ENDS Report was edited from 1981 to 1997 by Marek Mayer, who also was editorial director from 1997 until his death in 2005.

References

External links
 
 ENDS

English-language magazines
Environment of the United Kingdom
Environmental magazines
Magazines established in 1978
Magazines published in London
Monthly magazines published in the United Kingdom
News magazines published in the United Kingdom
Professional and trade magazines